Charles Calvert was a British, silent-era film director. He was sometimes credited as C.C. Calvert or Captain Charles Calvert. Calvert had a reputation as a journeyman director who produced old-fashioned films.

Selected filmography
 Disraeli (1916)
 The Edge of Youth (1920)
 Walls of Prejudice (1920)
 A Prince of Lovers (1922)
 Bonnie Prince Charlie (1923)
 Lights of London (1923)

References

Bibliography
 Bamford, Kenton. Distorted Images: British National Identity and Film in the 1920s. I.B. Tauris, 1999.

External links
 

Year of birth unknown
Year of death unknown
British film directors